Accommodation of Crews (Fishermen) Convention, 1966 is  an International Labour Organization Convention.

It was established in 1966, with the preamble stating:
Having decided upon the adoption of certain proposals with regard to accommodation on board fishing vessels, which is included in the sixth item on the agenda of the session,...

Ratifications
As of 2022, the convention has been ratified by 23 states. Six ratifying states have denounced the treaty by automatic action.

External links 
Text.
Ratifications.

International Labour Organization conventions
Treaties concluded in 1966
Treaties entered into force in 1968
Treaties of Azerbaijan
Treaties of Belgium
Treaties of Brazil
Treaties of Denmark
Treaties of Djibouti
Treaties of France
Treaties of West Germany
Treaties of Kyrgyzstan
Treaties of Greece
Treaties of Montenegro
Treaties of the Netherlands
Treaties of Norway
Treaties of Panama
Treaties of the Soviet Union
Treaties of Serbia and Montenegro
Treaties of Yugoslavia
Treaties of Sierra Leone
Treaties of Slovenia
Treaties of Francoist Spain
Treaties of Tajikistan
Treaties of North Macedonia
Treaties of the Ukrainian Soviet Socialist Republic
Treaties of the United Kingdom
Admiralty law treaties
Treaties extended to Aruba
Treaties extended to the Faroe Islands
Treaties extended to Greenland
Treaties extended to French Comoros
Treaties extended to French Guiana
Treaties extended to French Somaliland
Treaties extended to French Polynesia
Treaties extended to Guadeloupe
Treaties extended to Martinique
Treaties extended to New Caledonia
Treaties extended to Réunion
Treaties extended to Saint Pierre and Miquelon
1966 in labor relations